The presidential transition of Bongbong Marcos started when former senator Bongbong Marcos won the Philippine presidential election on May 9, 2022. Marcos topped the official count by the Congress of the Philippines with 31,629,783 votes. The joint bicameral Congress proclaimed Marcos as the president-elect and Sara Duterte as the vice president-elect on May 25, 2022. The transition lasted until the day of the president-elect's inauguration on June 30, 2022.

Timeline

Pre-election 

 May 5: Outgoing president Rodrigo Duterte names the chairperson of his transition committee.
 May 9: Election Day; Marcos leads the initial unofficial count in the Commission on Elections (COMELEC) transparency server.

Post-election 

 May 10:
 Outgoing president Duterte creates his Presidential Transition Committee (PTC).
 Initial transition talks between the teams of the outgoing and incoming president begin.
 The COMELEC en banc reaffirms the junking of Marcos' disqualification cases, which were all previously denied before the election.
 May 12: Marcos assumes victory and begins forming his transition committee.
 May 13: Marcos makes the UniTeam transition team public.
 May 25: Marcos, along with his running mate Sara Duterte, are officially proclaimed by the joint bicameral Congress as the president-elect and vice president-elect.
 May 17 and 18: Marcos' disqualification cases are elevated to the Supreme Court after being junked by the COMELEC en banc.
 June 28: The Supreme Court denies Marcos' disqualification cases, clearing the last legal hurdle to Marcos' candidacy.
 June 30: Inauguration Day

Organization of the transition

Marcos' transition committee 
Marcos began forming his transition committee on May 12, 2022, even before his proclamation. By the time his team was being organized, he led the unofficial count in the Commission on Elections transparency server. The members of his team were named on May 13, 2022.

Duterte's transition committee 
On May 5, 2022, before the start of the elections, incumbent president Rodrigo Duterte named the chairperson of his transition team. Duterte later issued Administrative Order No. 47 on May 10, 2022 creating the Presidential Transition Committee (PTC) "to ensure a peaceful, orderly and smooth transfer of powers to the next duly elected president.

Cabinet appointments 
Marcos began naming the members of his cabinet on May 12, 2022. According to Marcos' spokesperson, his main requirements for selecting members of his cabinet are competence, qualification, love for country, and respect for the constitution.

Other officials

References

Transition
2022 Philippine presidential election
Philippine presidential transitions